Modesto Brocos y Gómez (9 February 1852 – 28 November 1936) was a Galician-Brazilian painter and engraver.

His work covers a wide variety of styles and subjects, and he was the author of several books on painting. He is also notable for his promotion of printmaking in Brazil, especially woodcuts, of which he had been one of his adopted country's first major practitioners during his time at O Mequetrefe.

Biography 

He was born in Santiago de Compostela, Galicia, Spain, into a humble family with artistic inclinations. His grandfather and father were writers and his brother was the sculptor , who was also his first teacher at the Academia de Belas Artes in A Coruña. At the age of eighteen, after completing his studies, he moved to Argentina, but wasn't successful there. Two years later he moved to Brazil, where he eventually found work in Rio de Janeiro illustrating the mildly satirical weekly republican magazine O Mequetrefe (a term that describes a nosy person who is a bit of a scamp). This income enabled him to enter the Academia Imperial de Belas Artes, where he studied under Victor Meirelles and João Zeferino da Costa.

After two years there, he moved to Paris, enrolled at the École des Beaux-Arts and took lessons from Henri Lehmann. Dissatisfied with what he was being taught, he moved on to Madrid, where he studied briefly at the Real Academia de Bellas Artes de San Fernando), then in 1883 to Rome, after receiving a fellowship from the government of A Coruña. Once there, he worked with his countryman, Francisco Pradilla and spent five years at the Accademia Chigi.

By 1890, he was exhibiting at the Salon and felt that his education was complete, so he accepted an invitation to teach at the Escola Nacional de Belas Artes (successor to the Imperial Academy) from its Director, Rodolfo Bernardelli. He was able to become a naturalized citizen with little difficulty, and was appointed Professor of Figurative Drawing there, a position he held for the rest of his life, with a brief leave of absence to create some decorations for the Santiago de Compostela Cathedral.

Brocos died in Rio de Janeiro on 28 November 1936.

References

Further reading

Books by Brocos
 A questão do ensino de Bellas Artes, 1915. Catalog entry @ the Biblioteca Central  
 Viaje a Marte, Edit. Arte y Letras, 1930 @ Google Books 
 Retórica dos pintores, Typ. D’A Industria do Livro, 1933

Others
 Francisco Pablos, Pintores gallegos del novecientos : Serafín Avendaño, Modesto Brocos, Roman Navarro ..., A Coruña, Fundación Pedro Barrié de la Maza : Editorial Atlántico, 1981

External links 

 ArtNet: More works by Brocos

1852 births
1936 deaths
19th-century Brazilian painters
19th-century Brazilian male artists
20th-century Brazilian painters
20th-century Brazilian male artists
19th-century Spanish painters
19th-century Spanish male artists
20th-century Spanish painters
20th-century Spanish male artists
Brazilian people of Galician descent
Naturalized citizens of Brazil
People from Santiago de Compostela